Troy B. Benson (born July 30, 1963 in Altoona, Pennsylvania) is a former professional American football player who played linebacker for six seasons for the New York Jets. He is the younger brother of former New York Giants tackle Brad Benson

References

External links
Bio from Jets 1988 yearbook

1963 births
Living people
Sportspeople from Altoona, Pennsylvania
Players of American football from Pennsylvania
American football linebackers
Pittsburgh Panthers football players
New York Jets players